Tachina amica is a species of fly in the genus Tachina of the family Tachinidae that is endemic to Germany.

References

Insects described in 1837
Diptera of Europe
Endemic fauna of Germany
amica
Taxa named by Joseph Waltl